The  was the seventh season of the Japan Football League, the third tier of the Japanese football league system.

Overview 

It was contested by 16 teams, and Ehime FC won the championship.

Mitsubishi Motors Mizushima, Ryutsu Keizai University and Honda Lock were promoted from Regional Leagues by the virtue of their placing in the Regional League promotion series.

Table

Results

Top scorers

Attendance

Promotion and relegation 
No relegation has occurred due to expansion of the league to 18 teams. At the end the season, FC Ryukyu, JEF Reserves and Rosso Kumamoto were promoted from Regional leagues by the virtue of their placing in the Regional League promotion series.

References 

2005
3